Faluche is a traditional bread in the  Nord-Pas-de-Calais region of northern France and the Tournai region of southern  Belgium.

Faluche is a pale white bread that is soft and fairly dense. It is neither a round nor flat bread but looks somewhat like a small deflated soccer ball. It may be eaten hot at breakfast with butter and jam or with cream cheese and smoked salmon or later as a snack with butter and brown sugar or with brie cheese. Faluche is made with white flour, baker's yeast, water, a little salt and butter. In a bakery, faluche was often baked as the oven was just heating up before the main baking.

References

External links
 The entry to Faluche (pain) in the French Wikipedia

French breads
Belgian cuisine
Walloon culture
Nord-Pas-de-Calais
Hainaut (province)
Tournai